Everaldo Stum (born 5 July 1991), simply known as Everaldo, is a Brazilian professional footballer who plays as a forward for Brazilian club Bahia.

Career
Born in Garibaldi, Rio Grande do Sul, Everaldo graduated from Grêmio's academy, and made his first team debut on 5 November 2011, coming on as a second-half substitute in a 2-0 away loss against Atlético Mineiro, for the Campeonato Brasileiro Série A.

In 2012, Everaldo was loaned to Caxias. In 2013, after returning to Grêmio, he was loaned to CSA where he was top scorer in the 2013 Campeonato Alagoano, scoring 13 goals. His first professional goal came in a 6-0 win over Sport Atalaia. He then returned back to Grêmio in the same year.

On 17 April 2014 Everaldo was loaned to Figueirense until the end of the season. He scored his first top-flight goal for Figueirense, in a 1-1 draw with Flamengo. This was the first of 6 goals he went onto score during this season. On 29 April 2015, he returned to Figueira until the end of the 2015 season.

From 2015, Everaldo continued to club hop over the next couple of seasons, playing for five different clubs in Brazil as well as a brief stint in Saudi Arabia with Al Faisaly. Playing for ten clubs over seven seasons (2011–2017), Everaldo had played 153 games and scored 38 goals.

For the 2017–18 season, Everaldo signed for Liga MX side Querétaro. Scoring only 4 goals in 33 appearances in his first season, then 1 in 16 in his second, he was loaned out to Chapecoense in the middle of the Mexican 2018–19 season, in time for the 2019 Brazilian season. He went on to score 17 goals across all competitions for Chapecoense, including his first goal in a continental competition, scoring against Unión La Calera in 1-1 draw in the Copa Sudamericana. His personal best season in terms of goal returns was unfortunately not enough to save Chapecoense from relegation.

In January 2020, Everaldo signed for J.League club Kashima Antlers. He scored his first goal for the club in a 4-2 league win over Yokohama F. Marinos, the first of 18 goals he went on to score in 36 appearances in his debut season for Kashima. He finished the season as second top scorer in the division, only behind MVP Michael Olunga and was awarded a place in the 2020 J.League Best XI – one of two players picked from teams other than league champions Kawasaki Frontale.

Everaldo was unable to replicate his goalscoring form in his second season with Kashima, only scoring one league goal in 28 appearances in 2021. Due to his form, in the second half of the season he lost his place in the starting XI to Ayase Ueda. However, he did end up as top goalscorer in the Emperor's Cup scoring 5 goals in just 4 games.

After three seasons in Japan, in December 2022 it was announced that Everaldo would be returning to Brazil, joining Bahia.

Career statistics

Honors

Individual
J.League Best XI: 2020

References

External links

1991 births
Living people
Sportspeople from Rio Grande do Sul
Brazilian footballers
Association football forwards
Campeonato Brasileiro Série A players
Campeonato Brasileiro Série B players
Campeonato Brasileiro Série C players
Campeonato Brasileiro Série D players
Grêmio Foot-Ball Porto Alegrense players
Sociedade Esportiva e Recreativa Caxias do Sul players
Centro Sportivo Alagoano players
Figueirense FC players
Paysandu Sport Club players
Santa Cruz Futebol Clube players
Grêmio Novorizontino players
Atlético Clube Goianiense players
Saudi Professional League players
Al-Faisaly FC players
Liga MX players
Querétaro F.C. footballers
Associação Chapecoense de Futebol players
Kashima Antlers players
Esporte Clube Bahia players
J1 League players
Brazilian expatriate footballers
Brazilian expatriate sportspeople in Saudi Arabia
Brazilian expatriate sportspeople in Mexico
Brazilian expatriate sportspeople in Japan
Expatriate footballers in Saudi Arabia
Expatriate footballers in Mexico
Expatriate footballers in Japan